Andrew J. Drake (1907 - death date unknown) was a professional baseball catcher in the Negro leagues. He played with the Birmingham Black Barons, Louisville Black Caps, Chicago American Giants, and St. Louis Stars from 1932 to 1939.

References

External links
 and Seamheads

Birmingham Black Barons players
Chicago American Giants players
Louisville Black Caps players
St. Louis Stars (1939) players
1907 births
Year of death missing
Baseball catchers
Baseball players from Tennessee
People from Kenton, Tennessee